Uplike was an online photo sharing and social networking service based in France that let users share inspirations with the public. The app was created by Emmanuel Francoise. The service allowed users to share inspirations privately and publicly. The app was used by millions of people in 160+ countries worldwide. The app was compared to Pinterest. The Uplike secure cloud is where the bookmarks are saved, which can be also added as secret.

Uplike was available for iOS and Android.

In 2015, The Next Web called Uplike the "French startup with the highest growth".

In 2017, Uplike announced that it would refocus on its chatbot creation platform activity under the Botnation brand.

Awards
 European Startup of The Year 2013 at  Luxembourg ICT Awards .
 Fastest growing tech by The Next Web.

References

Imageboards
Multilingual websites
French social networking websites